Thái Nguyên is a province in the Northeast region of Vietnam. Its multi-ethnic society is composed of eight ethnic groups.

With its rich mineral resources and salubrious climate, the province offers significant opportunities for industrial development for both domestic and foreign investors. Thái Nguyên is also known as an educational centre and ranks 3rd nationwide, having 21 universities and colleges. The province is also the centre of tea industry in the country with an area of 16,000 ha. The tea produced here is considered to have the finest quality throughout Vietnam.

History

Demographics

The male population during this period was 629,197 while the female population was 657,554. The rural population was 876,484 against an urban population of 410,267 (about 47% of the rural population).

There are about 50 ethnic groups in Thái Nguyên recognized by the Vietnamese government. Each ethnicity has their own language, traditions, and subculture. The largest ethnic groups are: Vietnamese (70.13%), followed by Tày, Nùng, Sán Dìu and Sán Chay

Demographic distribution varies greatly: population density in the highlands and mountainous regions is low, while that of urban areas is very high. Vo Nhai District has lowest population density with 72 inhabitants/km2 and Thái Nguyên city has the highest with 1,260 inhabitants/km2.

Geography

Thái Nguyên borders six provinces: Bắc Kạn, Vĩnh Phúc, Tuyên Quang, Lạng Sơn, Bắc Giang, Hanoi. Thái Nguyên is the gateway for socio-economic exchange with the Red River delta. It is 50 km from Noi Bai international airport, 200 km from the Chinese border, 75 km from the center of Hanoi and 200 km from Hai Phong. The exchange is carried out via road, rail and waterways in the province Main water features include the Công River and Núi Cốc Lake.

Thái Nguyên has many mountain ranges running from south to north. The structure of them is made of strongly decayed rocks with many caves and valleys. In the southwest is the Tam Đảo mountain range, located on the northern fringe of the Red River Delta. The range spans some 80 kilometres, with its highest peak of 1,529 metres (note other sources state 1,590 or 1,592 metres) and many cliffs running from northwest to southeast.

The Tam Đảo mountain region is protected by the Tam Đảo National Park, established in 1996, which is one of the largest national parks in the country. There are over 20 peaks with the park area, others of note include Thien Thi at 1,375 m, Thach Ban at 1,388 m and Phu Nghia at 1,300 m. Sharp peaks with sloping sides and numerous, deep partitions are characteristic of the topology.  The boundary of the national park is located at an altitude of 100 m around the Tam Đảo range. There is a larger buffer zone (which has area of approximately 535 km2) which surrounds the national park which has an altitude below 100 m. Seventy per cent of the area of the park is covered by natural and artificial forest. The natural forest is about 220 km2 and the human altered forest is about 30 km2

There are two other mountain ranges in the province, both running in a northwest–southeast direction; the Ngan Son range running from Bắc Kạn to Võ Nhai District and the Bac Son range. Many of the mountains of Thái Nguyên province provide shelter for a considerable part from monsoon winds.

Climate
With terrain sloping from high mountains to the low zones and midlands, in terms  temperature in winter, Thái Nguyên has three climatic sub-zones. A cold sub-zone in Võ Nhai District, a temperate subzone including Định Hóa, Phú Lương and southern Võ Nhai districts and a warm subzone which includes Đại Từ, Đồng Hỷ, Phú Bình, Phổ Yên districts, Thái Nguyên City and Sông Công City.

The average temperatures in the hottest and the coldest months are 28.9 °C in June and 15.2 °C in January. The lowest recorded is 13.7 °C. Total number of sunny hours in a year is ranges between  1,300 and 1,750, which is equally distributed for months in a year. The climate is divided into 4 distinct seasons: Spring - Summer - Autumn - Winter. The average rainfall per annum lies in the range of 2,000 to 2,500 mm; it rains most in August and least in January. Generally speaking, Thái Nguyên's climate is favourable for developing agriculture and forestry.

Soil structure
Mountainous land accounts for 48.4% area and is formed from the decaying of magma, rocks and sedimentary rock. Hilly land accounts for 31.4% area and is made of condensed sand, clay and ancient alluvia. Hill land in some places such as Đại Từ, Phú Lương is 120 to 200 metres high and more with a sloping gradient of 5° to 20° and is an ideal place for planting industrial crops and perennial fruit trees. Field land accounts 12.4%, a part of which is scattered along streams and can be easily exposed to severe meteorological conditions (such as sudden floods and droughts) and is difficult to harvest. Of the total land area, 2,207.89 km2 (65.22% of natural area) are used and 1,096.69 km2 (30.78% of natural area) are unused. Of unused land area, only 17.14 km2 area is cultivable; bare land and deserted hills occupy 412.5 km2. A major problem faced by Thái Nguyên province is to recover deserted areas.

Economy and development
Farming, aquaculture and industries are some of the important economic activities of the province. In 2008, as against the national figure of 7,592 cooperatives of Agriculture, Forestry and Fishery cooperatives, there are only 83 agriculture cooperatives in the province. There were 638 farms as against the national number of 120,699 in 2008. The output value of agriculture produce at constant 1994 prices in the province was 1667.1 billion đồngs against the national value of 156681.9 billion đồngs.
The province produced 410,400 tonnes of cereals as against the national production of 43.68 million tonnes. The per capita production of cereals in the province was 356.9 kg as against the national figure of 501.9 kg in 2007. In 2007, the industrial output of the province was a meagre 11,987.5 Bhilldongs against the national output of 1.47 million Bhilldongs.

The economy of the province is largely dictated by its capital city, Thái Nguyên, which is the fastest growing city of North Vietnam. The city is the gateway to northwest Vietnam. It is famous for its tree plantations. Its historical importance is due to the fact that Ho Chi Minh resided here in the Phu Dinh village of Dinh Hoa district when he planned Dien Bien Phu. Before he moved to Hanoi, he came here from Tan Trao and declared independence. The city is also the centre of heavy industries of northern Vietnam. Thái Nguyên Iron and Steel Company (TISCO), which is located in Thái Nguyên city, is one of Vietnam's top 20 state-owned companies, and has made a sizable contribution to Vietnam's economy.

Samsung Electronics has their largest mobile phone factory in Thai Nguyen, employing over 60,000 people.[9] The factory has operated since 2014 and has an area of 100 ha.[10]

Thai Nguyen's export experienced a ten-fold increase to over US$23 billion in the 2013 – 2017 period. The province hosted nearly 7,200 businesses in 2020 with a combined capital value approaching US$5.4 billion.

As per Thai Nguyen's Department of Industry and Trade, for the first three quarters of 2020, the province's total industrial gross output exceeded US$27 billion, while the domestic economic sector achieved US$1.8 billion. Both of these were over 70 percent of the province's annual target. In the same period, foreign-invested enterprises generated close to US$23 billion, an increase of 2.3 percent over the previous year.

Among the province's industries, the electronics and high-tech domains delivered the best results. Their production increased by over 16 percent year-on-year for laptops, while earphone manufacturing grew by five percent.

The socioeconomics of Thai Nguyen has seen remarkable development. In the first three quarters of 2020, industry and construction covered nearly 60 percent of the province's economy while the services sector accounted for roughly one-third of the economy. In the same period, the province's GDP per capita reached US$4,260, while industrial production rose by over 16 percent, and local exports grew by over 13 percent.

Thai Nguyen has also experienced significant development in infrastructure and labor productivity. Recently, the province experienced an influx of sustainable ventures. In 2020, over ten investment certificates were granted to eco-friendly and energy-efficient ventures, with a combined worth of over US$30 million.

Over the past decade, Thai Nguyen attracted a considerable amount of foreign direct investment. Samsung's establishment of a mobile phone manufacturing complex in the province has dramatically boosted Thai Nguyen's FDI. The province achieved over 13 percent compound annual growth rate (CAGR) during the 2015–2020 period.

As per the Foreign Investment Agency (FIA), in August 2020, the province hosted over 172 foreign-invested projects. Together these enterprises added over US$8 billion in registered capital. This made Thai Nguyen among the country's top 10 localities in terms of international investment inflow.

In a bid to attract investors with industrial expertise, the province is concentrating on improving the local investment climate. Thai Nguyen has prioritized timely issuance of government policies, guidance, and support for financiers. Local authorities have also shown a keen interest in high technology industries and ancillaries.

In December 2020, Hong Kong's electronic firm, DBG Technology, was awarded an investment certificate by provincial authorities to set up a US$80 million manufacturing facility. This facility will manufacture laptops, cameras, phones, audio equipment, and home appliances. It is expected to generate a revenue of US$110 million annually, employing over 10,000 workers.

In the same month, China's Trina Solar received Thai Nguyen's approval to produce photovoltaic cells and solar power. With investment exceeding US$200 million, this facility has a planned capacity of over 250 million products a year. The plant is expected to begin operations from June 2021 and add over 1,800 jobs.

In November 2020, South Korean touchscreen manufacturer Samju Vina, injected capital to add a second plant in Thai Nguyen. This funding should raise its regional production per month from 20 million to 35 million units.

For enhancing its overall competitiveness, Thai Nguyen is actively encouraging the private and high-tech sectors to develop production clusters and connect value chains.

Industrial zones

Thai Nguyen's six industrial parks are spread over 1400 hectares of land area, five of which have already received funding. The province is promoting infrastructure investment in its 105-hectare Quyet Thang Hi-Tech Industrial Park that is situated eight kilometers away from Thai Nguyen city center.

The province's plans include 35 industrial clusters with an area of nearly 1,260 hectares. The province has called for investment in 11 of these clusters, which have a planned area of over 280 hectares. The province aims to attract investment in secondary industries that complement the Samsung group and increase its localization degree.

Specifically, industries in electronics, electric, software, high precision mechanical, and textile are favored. The investment locations promoted by Thai Nguyen include the industrial zones in Yen Binh, Diem Thuy, and Song Cong. These, along with the province-wide industrial clusters, are equipped with appropriate technical infrastructure to establish enterprises.

To raise funds, Thai Nguyen provincial authorities encouraged investors to lease land for 50 years for a one lump sum payment. Consequently, these efforts led to the collection of US$65 million to develop industrial parks.

The Diem Thuy Industrial Park is one such example and features 77 projects with combined investment exceeding US$1.1 billion. This park's projects are modern, eco-friendly, and employ over 20,000 locals.

Irrigation and hydroelectric power
Núi Cốc reservoir is 25 km west of Thái Nguyên city. The lake waters feeds an irrigation canal and a small hydroelectric power station with three units of 630 KW capacity each, for a total output of about 2 GWh. The irrigation system was built in 1977. However, the power plant construction on the irrigation canal was started in Jan 2008 and the plant commissioned in Jan 2010. A 22 kV transmission line carries the power to a nearby grid.

Transport
Two railway lines serve Thái Nguyên Province, and particularly the city of Thái Nguyên. The first line connects Hanoi Railway Station to Quán Triều Railway Station (Quán Triều Ward), and the second connects Lưu Xá Railway Station (Phú Xá Ward) to Hạ Long Railway Station, Hạ Long, via a railway junction at Kép in Bắc Giang province. Both lines were built after the First Indochina War; unlike most railway lines in Vietnam, which were established in metre gauge, the  Luu Xa–Hạ Long line was built at standard gauge, and the  Hanoi–Quán Triều line was built at mixed gauge. The rail spur connecting Luu Xa and Kép was a strategic line constructed between October 1965 and December 1966 by a railroad engineering division of the Chinese People's Liberation Army, who operated in North Vietnam repairing railway lines at the request of Ho Chi Minh.

Administrative divisions

Thái Nguyên is subdivided into 9 district-level sub-divisions and 178 commune-level sub-divisions:

Attractions
There are several tourist attractions in the province. Some of the ones outside the capital city are listed below.

Núi Cốc Lake
Núi Cốc Lake is the most popular attraction. Tour boats circle the lake, recounting local legends and visiting some of the 89 islands within it. Several islands feature historic remains, protected breeding sites for birds, or feral goats. In March 2007, an eco-tourism park was developed beside the lake. It features musical fountains, an animal park, and a Fairy Tale House Underworld and Water park.

Phuong Hoang cave
Phuong Hoang (Phoenix) cave is one of the largest caves in Vietnam, located at a distance of 40 km from Thái Nguyên city. The cave has four chambers where stalagmite and stalactite formations can be seen. Two of the caves admit some sunlight when the sun is at the right angle. Otherwise, artificial light is required to see the Hisinterior.

Historical Safe Zone 

Historical Safe Zone (An toàn khu – ATK) locates in Định Hóa district. This was the place where president Ho Chi Minh had lived for several years in The Resistance War against France (1945 -1954)

Distinctive cuisine
Besides its famous tea, the province is known for such local culinary specialties as bún chả and phở noodle dishes, Định Hóa rice, Dầy cake, and hill chicken. But its most famous food is Bánh chưng from Bờ Đậu village about 10 km north of Thái Nguyên City in Phú Lương District, where both sides of the road are lined with shops selling the local specialty made from glutinous rice cake, mung bean puree, and pork wrapped in aromatic leaves (usually Stachyphrynium placentarium, sometimes banana) and tied up with string made from a kind of bamboo, which can be used to slice the rice cake into portions for sharing. Tết is the village's busiest season.

Gallery

References

External links

Official website
Official Forum

 
Northeast (Vietnam)
Provinces of Vietnam